King's Worthy railway station was a station on the Didcot, Newbury and Southampton Railway in England. It was built in 1909 as a direct petition from local residents of Easton and Abbots Worthy.

Construction of the station resulted in the addition of another passing loop on the line and a single siding which was later provided with a goods shed. Five years before the closure of the station the passing loop was removed leaving the station building on the remaining single platform (previously the northbound platform) which still stands today.

Map

Routes

References

Disused railway stations in Hampshire
Former Great Western Railway stations
Railway stations in Great Britain opened in 1909
Railway stations in Great Britain closed in 1942
Railway stations in Great Britain opened in 1943
Railway stations in Great Britain closed in 1960